The 2007 Vuelta a San Juan was held from 11  to 21 January 2007 in Argentina. It was a multiple stage road cycling race that took part over a prologue and ten stages.

Men's stage summary

Men's top 10 overall

References
 De Wielersite report
 Infobiker report

Vuelta a San Juan
Vuelta a San Juan
Vuelta a San Juan
January 2007 sports events in South America